NH 51 may refer to:

 National Highway 51 (India)
 New Hampshire Route 51, United States